The 2014–15 Southern Utah Thunderbirds basketball team represented Southern Utah University during the 2014–15 NCAA Division I men's basketball season. The Thunderbirds were led by third year head coach Nick Robinson and played their home games at the Centrum Arena. They were members of the Big Sky Conference. They finished the season 10–19, 7–11 in Big Sky play to finish in ninth place. They failed to qualify for the Big Sky tournament.

Roster

Schedule

|-
!colspan=9 style="background:#FF0000; color:#FFFFFF;"| Exhibition

|-
!colspan=9 style="background:#FF0000; color:#FFFFFF;"| Regular season

References

Southern Utah Thunderbirds men's basketball seasons
Southern Utah
2014 in sports in Utah
2015 in sports in Utah